Cuyuni-Mazaruni (Region 7)  is a region of Guyana. Venezuela claims the territory as part of Guayana Esequiba.

It borders the regions of Barima-Waini, Essequibo Islands-West Demerara and Pomeroon-Supenaam to the north, the region of Upper Demerara-Berbice to the east, the region of Potaro-Siparuni and Brazil to the south.

Its capital is Bartica, with villages including Issano, Kartabo, Kamarang, and Imbaimadai.

It covers an area of 47,213 km². Before the 1980 administrative reform most of the area belonged to the Mazaruni-Potaro district.

Population
The Government of Guyana has administered three official censuses since the 1980 administrative reforms, in 1980, 1991 and 2002.  In 2012, the population of Cuyuni-Mazaruni was recorded at 20,280 people. Official census records for the population of the Cuyuni-Mazaruni Region are as follows:

2012 : 20,280
2002 : 17,597
1991 : 14,794
1980 : 14,390

Communities
(including name variants):

Agatash
Arau (Arau Village)
Bartica (Barteke)
Imbaimadai
Issano
Isseneru
Kamarang
Kartabo
Kurupung
Kurututo
Opadai
Paruima (Paruima Mission)
Pipillipai
Saint Marys (Saint Mary's)
Waramdan (Waramadong Village, Waramdan)
Wineperu
Wolga

Gallery

See also
 Mazaruni River

References

 
Regions of Guyana